Trimezia is a genus of flowering plants in the family Iridaceae, native to the warmer parts of southern Mexico, Central America, South America, Florida, and the West Indies. Trimezia is placed in the tribe Trimezieae. The division of the tribe into genera has varied considerably. In one approach, it contains only the genus Trimezia, which then includes the genera Neomarica, Pseudotrimezia and Pseudiris. In other approaches, two to five genera are recognized, sometimes also including the genus Deluciris.

The English names walking iris, apostle's iris and apostle plant have been used for many species, regardless of the generic placement (e.g. for Trimezia gracilis, syn. Neomarica gracilis). New plantlets form at the end of the flower spikes; after flowering, the spikes fall over and a new plant grows, so the plant "walks". Names including "apostle" refer to the incorrect belief that plants do not flower until 12 or more leaves are present.

Description
The rootstock is variously described as an elongated corm or a rhizome. Linear to lanceolate leaves grow from the base of the plant. Most species have flowers in some shade of yellow. The six tepals are arranged in two series. The outer tepals (sepals) are larger than the inner ones (petals); both may have brown-purple markings at the base. The stamens have free filaments (i.e. they not fused together or fused to the style). The style is divided into three branches, each of which usually has two lobes.

Taxonomy
The genus Trimezia was first published with an appropriate description by William Herbert in 1844. Herbert attributed the name to Salisbury, whose use he described as "" ('without character'). The genus name is derived from the Greek words tri, meaning "three", and meze, meaning "greater".

Trimezia is placed in the tribe Trimezieae of the subfamily Iridoideae. The number of genera into which the tribe is divided has varied considerably. Three genera were used before 2008: Trimezia, Neomarica and Pseudotrimezia. Some sources used all three; others combined Trimezia and Neomarica but retained Pseudotrimezia. A further genus, Pseudiris, was published in 2008. Molecular phylogenetic studies have shown that although the tribe is monophyletic, the genera as traditionally used, based on morphological characteristics, are not. Three of the four main clades found in these analyses combine species from more than one genus. One response to these findings, adopted  by Plants of the World Online and the World Checklist of Selected Plant Families, is to combine genera; thus Neomarica, Pseudiris and Pseudotrimezia are all placed within Trimezia. An alternative approach, retaining the traditional genera but with changed circumscriptions, was put forward in 2018; an additional new genus, Deluciris, was also created within the tribe.

Distinction between genera
When Trimezia was distinguished from Neomarica prior to molecular phylogenetic studies, i.e. entirely on morphological grounds, some vegetative characters were considered diagnostic. Trimezia in this sense always grows from corms, Neomarica almost always from rhizomes. Trimezia has flowering stems (scapes) that are circular in cross-section, whereas Neomarica has flattened scapes. Lovo et al. (2018) consider these characteristics to be among those distinguishing their circumscription of Neomarica from the other genera into which they divide the tribe.

Species

, the World Checklist of Selected Plant Families accepted about 80 species of Trimezia. However, this includes species that other sources place in different genera in the tribe Trimezieae. The placement in Lovo et al. (2018), where given in their paper, is shown in the second column.

Former species
Some former species which are now regarded as synonyms include:
Trimezia martii (Baker) R.C.Foster = Trimezia spathata subsp. spathata
Trimezia meridensis Herb. = Trimezia martinicensis
Trimezia rupestris Ravenna = Deluciris rupestris
Trimezia sincorana Ravenna = Trimezia spathata subsp. sincorana
Trimezia violacea (Klatt) Ravenna = Deluciris violacea

Distribution and habitat
The genus is native to the warmer parts of southern Mexico, Central America, South America, Florida, and parts of the West Indies. Trimezia species typically grow in damp grassland.

References

 
Iridaceae genera